Slim Tletli (born April 6, 1951) is a Tunisian politician. He was the Minister of Tourism under former President Zine El Abidine Ben Ali.

References

Government ministers of Tunisia
Living people
Place of birth missing (living people)
1951 births